Saidabad (also Romanized as Sa‘īdābād; also known as Bīzhanābād-e Vosţá) is a village in Rudbar Rural District, in the Central District of Rudbar-e Jonubi County, Kerman Province, Iran. At the 2006 census, its population was 1,436, in 291 families.

References 

Populated places in Rudbar-e Jonubi County